Linsey Dawn McKenzie (born 7 August 1978) is an English glamour model, pornographic performer, and television personality who made her topless modelling debut in the Sunday Sport tabloid newspaper on her 16th birthday in 1994. Known for her naturally large breasts, she went on to feature in a wide range of adult magazines, websites, broadcast media, and videos, including hardcore pornography productions after 2000.

She has attained minor celebrity status in the United Kingdom, where she has appeared on a number of mainstream television programmes, such as They Think It's All Over, I'm Famous and Frightened!, The Weakest Link, and Celebrity Four Weddings. She has also appeared in documentaries about the lives of glamour models and was featured in Martin Gooch's 2002 film Arthur's Amazing Things.

Early life
McKenzie was born in Brent, Middlesex and grew up in Wallington, Surrey. She is the youngest of three children. Her parents, Tony and Lesley McKenzie, divorced in 1987.

Career
In early 1994, when McKenzie was 15, she sent sample glamour photographs to local modelling agencies. She began her modelling career by glamour modelling and swimsuit work, intending to progress to topless modelling when she turned 16 later that year. At the time, under the Protection of Children Act of 1978, 16-year-olds could still legally model topless in England and Wales; the legal minimum age was raised to 18 by the Sexual Offences Act of 2003.

As McKenzie approached her 16th birthday, the Sunday Sport tabloid newspaper expressed an interest in turning her topless debut into a media event. Throughout June and July 1994, it published pictures of McKenzie, counting down the days until it could legally show her topless.

After she turned 16, McKenzie continued to model topless for the Daily Sport and the Sunday Sport. She also made Page 3 appearances in tabloid newspapers The Sun and The Daily Star; posed topless in lads' mags such as Loaded; appeared fully nude in British magazines such as Mayfair  and Men Only; and performed in a variety of softcore videos.

On 29 July 1995, shortly before her 17th birthday, McKenzie did a topless streak at a televised cricket match between England and the West Indies at Old Trafford. Wearing only a thong and a pair of trainers, she ran onto the field with the words "Only Teasing" written across her breasts.

After McKenzie turned 18 in 1996, she made her North American modelling debut in the breast fetishism magazine Score, which marked the occasion by making McKenzie the cover girl of its December 1996 "50th Anniversary" issue.

In the late 1990s, McKenzie was frequently featured on the adult-oriented channels L!VE TV and Television X. She continued to appear regularly in magazines, DVDs, Internet sites, and broadcast media until late 2004, when she took a break from modelling to have a child and undergo a breast reduction operation.

A biography of McKenzie, Temptress: The Linsey Dawn McKenzie Story, was published in 2015.

Appearances

McKenzie's mainstream television appearances include the BBC sporting quiz show They Think It's All Over, the reality television shows I'm Famous and Frightened! and The Salon, and the science programme Brainiac: Science Abuse. In the United States, she appeared on The Howard Stern Show in January 2003. On 8 September 2007, she appeared on a special charity edition of the BBC quiz show The Weakest Link, on which all contestants were glamour models who were dating or married to footballers. In December 2010, she featured with her husband Mark Williams on an episode of Living TV's Celebrity Four Weddings. The episode also featured actress Tina Malone, Big Brother contestant Spencer Smith and magician Paul Daniels and his wife, Debbie McGee.

Additionally, McKenzie has appeared in two documentaries about the lives of glamour models, The Curse of Page 3  and Girls Behaving Badly. She also played the character Beryl fforbes-Juggs in Martin Gooch's 2002 film Arthur's Amazing Things.

Personal life
In 1996, McKenzie became involved in an extramarital affair with 27-year-old footballer Dean Holdsworth, who then played for Wimbledon F.C. The relationship received widespread attention in the British media.

In 1998, she became engaged to actor Michael Greco, who at the time was playing the role of Beppe di Marco in the BBC soap opera EastEnders. She twice became pregnant over the course of her 15-month relationship with Greco, but miscarried both times.

McKenzie began dating 21-year-old Terry Canty in 2000. The couple married on 21 April 2001 and Canty performed with McKenzie in her first heterosexual hardcore photoshoots and video. Scenes featuring the couple were released on the 2001 DVD Ultimate Linsey. The couple separated six weeks after their wedding, and they divorced in 2001.

In 2004, McKenzie began a relationship with former Wimbledon F.C. and Northern Ireland footballer Mark Williams. On 16 May 2005, she gave birth to the couple's baby boy. McKenzie married Williams on 5 January 2006.

See also
 List of British pornographic actors
 Pornography in the United Kingdom

References

Further reading

External links

 
 
 
 

English pornographic film actresses
English female adult models
Glamour models
Association footballers' wives and girlfriends
Page 3 girls
1978 births
Living people
People from Wallington, London